Azar Gat (born 1959 in Haifa, Israel) is a researcher and author on military history, military strategy and war and peace in general. Along with Steven Pinker and others, Gat argues that war is in decline in today's world. 

He is currently Ezer Weizman Professor of National Security and in his second term (first from 1999–2003) as Chair of the Department of Political Science at Tel Aviv University. He is the founder and head of the University's Executive Masters Program in Diplomacy and Security. Gat is also a Major in the Israeli Army.

Gat holds a doctoral degree from the University of Oxford (1984–86), an MA from Tel Aviv University (1979–83), and a BA from the University of Haifa (1975–78).

He has been Alexander von Humboldt Fellow at the University of Freiburg, Germany; Fulbright Fellow at Yale University, US; British Council Scholar at the University of Oxford, Great Britain; visiting fellow at the Mershon Center, Ohio State University, US; Goldman Visiting Israeli Professor at Georgetown University, US; and Koret Distinguished Visiting Fellow for Israel Studies at the Hoover Institution, Stanford University, US.

Gat's War in Human Civilization, published in 2006 by the Oxford University Press, was named one of the best books of the year by The Times Literary Supplement.

Research
Azar Gat started his career focusing on military history and strategy, exemplified in his 1989 book The Origins of Military Thought from the Enlightenment to Clausewitz, a book frequently cited especially in relation to Carl von Clausewitz. Over the years he has broadened his scope to include causes, especially the prehistoric causes of war.

In conclusion, let us understand more closely the evolutionary calculus that can make the highly dangerous activity of fighting over resources worthwhile. In our societies of plenty, it might be difficult to comprehend how precarious people's subsistence in pre-modern societies was (and still is). The spectre of hunger and starvation always loomed over their heads. Affecting both mortality and reproduction (the latter through human sexual appetite and women's fertility), it constantly, in varying degrees, trimmed down their numbers, acting in combination with disease. Thus, struggle over resources was very often evolutionarily cost-effective.

In War in Human Civilization (2006) and following up in Victorious and Vulnerable: Why Democracy won in the 20th Century and How it is Still Imperiled, Gat argues that the world has been becoming steadily more peaceful for thousands of years. He finds that there are two major steps to this process. The first came with the emergence of the state: When populations entered into a social contract with the state, they gave up parts of their autonomy in return for the state taking care of their security. The second step came with modernization and the industrial revolution, which led to economic growth and interdependence and a corresponding increase in affluence and standard of living. It also brought with it liberal democracies and nuclear deterrence. Both these steps and all of these factors led to a reduction in wars and war casualties. In other words, peace has become profitable and therefore more common. At the same time, there are still countries less affected by this development, and war is more frequent in these parts of the world. In claiming that war is in decline, Gat aligns with Steven Pinker, Joshua Goldstein, and Robert Muchembled, who all argue the same although they identify different causal mechanisms behind the phenomena.

Gat's broad views on war and its links to culture and human nature are similar to those of Steven A. LeBlanc and Steven Pinker. He incorporates viewpoints from ethology, evolution, evolutionary psychology, anthropology, archaeology, history, historical sociology, and political science. See especially his seminal 2006 book War in Human Civilization. Another example is the paper "The Human Motivational Complex: Evolutionary Theory And The Causes Of Hunter-Gatherer Fighting.", blockquoted above and cited in "Evolutionary Psychology, Memes and the Origin of War".

Gat believes in the antiquity of the nations. In his view, ancient Egypt, Israel and classical Athens were national states.

Publications

Books

Journal articles

Azar Gat's research while affiliated with Tel Aviv University and other places

References

External links
The Return of Authoritarian Capitalists, op-ed in NY Times, June 14, 2007
Interview with Gat on "New Books in History"

1959 births
Living people
Theoretical historians
Israeli military historians
Academic staff of Tel Aviv University
University of Haifa alumni